The Zotye T300 was a subcompact crossover produced by Zotye Auto.

Overview
Previewed by the T300 concept car during the 2016 Beijing Auto Show, the T300 is positioned under the Zotye T500 compact crossover. The production version was later revealed in early 2017 with the Pricing of the Zotye T700 ranges from 60,800 to 80,000 yuan.

Powertrain
The engine displacements of the T300 is a 1.5 liter engine with a maximum engine power of 82.0kW, a maximum horsepower of 111PS and maximum torque of 143.0N ·M. Two gearbox options are available with a 5-speed manual and a continuously variable transmission.

References

Notes

External links

 众泰汽车

Cars of China
T300
Crossover sport utility vehicles
Mini sport utility vehicles
Front-wheel-drive vehicles
Cars introduced in 2016